Vojtěch Benedikt Juhn (March 21, 1779 - November 27, 1843, Jindřichův Hradec) was a Czech painter and engraver.

Juhn was born in Pelhřimov where his father was a tailor. During his studies he decided to study theology. He served as rector of the seminary. His theological career ended as Jindřichův Hradec provost.

In art he became famous because of his popular engravings of city views. Juhn captured the character of local cities such as České Budějovice, Jindřichův Hradec, Pacov, Počátky, Prachatice, Kamenice nad Lipou, Písek, Tábor, and Vodňany.

He collaborated with leading engravers George Karl Dobler and Postle, who was the first Czech classical landscape painter and printmaker. Juhn's works are often found at the top of the various guilds' diplomas, certificates for journeyman apprenticeship certificates and similar publications. Many of his sketchbooks, paintings and engravings over time have been lost.

Juhn died in Jindřichův Hradec on November 27, 1843, and was buried at the cemetery at the former church of St. Trinity.

References 

Czech painters
Czech male painters
1779 births
1843 deaths
People from Pelhřimov